Muscle infarction may refer to:
 Myocardial infarction of heart muscle
 Skeletal muscle infarction